The Lawnmower Man is a video game based on the 1992 film of the same name. The game was published in Japan by Coconuts Japan (ココナッツジャパンエンターテイメント) under the title .

Plot
Dr. Lawrence Angelo is a scientist working for Virtual Space Industries (VSI) in "Project 5", a secret research facility that attempts to increase the intelligence of primates using psychotropic drugs and virtual reality (VR) training. Dr. Angelo is reluctant to use the research for military purposes, and after one of the chimps escapes and shoots a guard, Dr. Angelo is given a forced vacation. While taking notes on the need for experiment with a human subject, he discovers Jobe Smith (Jeff Fahey), a man with an intellectual disability who makes his living by doing odd jobs such as mowing the grass (hence the title of the movie). Angelo takes in Jobe, subjecting him to VR treatment. The first experiments quickly increase Jobe's intelligence, but after an accident, Dr. Angelo stops the experiments. The Shop, a secret agency overseeing Project 5, reinserts the drugs responsible for Jobe's violent behavior into the program and speeds up the treatment. As Jobe develops telekinetic powers, he starts to take revenge on those who abused him before he began the treatments, and plots to take over all of the computers in the world.

The SNES version continues the storyline after the point where it ends in the film. Jobe transfers his mind into VSI's computers, and from there is able to corrupt and destroy information systems all over the world, a course of action which is implied to bring about Dystopia. With society in complete meltdown, Dr. Angelo discovers that Jobe has been acting under the control of a person known as Zorn the Doomplayer, who is the head of The Shop, and poised to take over what remains of the world. With Jobe apparently gone missing, Angelo sets off to put an end to The Shop once and for all.

Gameplay
While the CD version of the game (PC, Sega CD) is an interactive movie, all three cartridge versions are platform games. The player takes control of either Dr. Angelo or Carla Parkette (the mother of Jobe's best friend) in typical side-scrolling shooting action, similar to Contra and Metal Slug. The player collects weapon upgrades or data discs. Once the player has collected a number of data discs, the discs morph into a Virtual Suit that gives the player protection from one hit.

The player visits several locations seen in the movie, such as Harley's Gas 'Er Up and the VSI headquarters. The game includes true 3D level connectors that are based on the CG sequences of the movie. These involve avoiding obstacles and the occasional high-speed shooting in the VR world. There are four different levels (Virtual World, Cyber War, Cyber Run and Cyber Tube), and each takes a slightly different approach. Virtual World is set in first person and the objective is to dodge obstacles such as trees and arches to get to the exit. Cyber War is similar to Virtual World, but with some shooting stops. Cyber Run is set in the third person and requires occasional shooting of obstacles, while Cyber Tube involves fast travel and plenty of enemies in a VR tunnel.

Reception

Reviewing the Genesis version, GamePro criticized that the quality of the controls and graphics varies through the game, but praised the game's combination of "above average" run-n-shoot adventure, "hypnotic" first-person flying, and "brain-teasing" puzzles.

GamePro commented that the Sega CD version makes good use of the system's audio and graphical capabilities, but that the puzzle-based gameplay is dull. Electronic Gaming Monthly also had similar thoughts of Sega CD version.

In 1996, Computer Gaming World declared Lawnmower Man the 42nd-worst computer game ever released.

Legacy
In late 1995, SCi released a sequel for MS-DOS and Macintosh computers known as CyberWar. Copies of the sequel are quite rare, as it had a limited release by Interplay instead of the publisher of the first game, Time Warner Interactive. CyberWar splits from the story of the second movie, Lawnmower Man 2: Beyond Cyberspace, and has its own story. In early 1996, rumors of a third Lawnmower Man video game were spread via chatrooms and video game magazines such as Next Generation and Electronic Gaming Monthly's Quartermann column. The rumors suggested a release for Sega Saturn, Sony PlayStation and Nintendo 64, but no further sequels were produced and no further news has been reported by these publications.

Notes

References

External links
 

1993 video games
Coconuts Japan games
DOS games
Full motion video based games
Nintendo Entertainment System games
Classic Mac OS games
Super Nintendo Entertainment System games
Sega Genesis games
Sega CD games
THQ games
Teque London games
Video games based on films
Video games scored by Allister Brimble
Video games developed in the United Kingdom
Single-player video games
Time Warner Interactive games
Works about vacationing
Science fiction video games